Glandulocauda is a genus of small characin freshwater fish that are endemic to Brazil, where restricted to the upper Paraná basin and coastal river basins in São Paulo state. The genus it is closely related to Lophiobrycon and Mimagoniates, and they form the tribe Glandulocaudini.

Species
There are currently two recognized species in this genus.
 Glandulocauda caerulea Menezes & S. H. Weitzman, 2009
 Glandulocauda melanopleura (M. D. Ellis, 1911)

References

Characidae
Fish of South America
Endemic fauna of Brazil